Prajnesh Gunneswaran was the defending champion but lost in the final to Jay Clarke.

Clarke won the title after defeating Gunneswaran 6–4, 6–3 in the final.

Seeds
All seeds receive a bye into the second round.

Draw

Finals

Top half

Section 1

Section 2

Bottom half

Section 3

Section 4

References

External links
Main draw
Qualifying draw

Kunming Open - Men's singles
2019 Men's Singles